The 2010–11 James Madison Dukes men's basketball team represented James Madison University in the 2010–11 NCAA Division I men's basketball season. The Dukes, led by head coach Matt Brady, played their home games at the JMU Convocation Center in Harrisonburg, Virginia, as members of the Colonial Athletic Association. The Dukes finished sixth in the CAA during the regular season, and were upset in the first round of the CAA tournament by William & Mary.

James Madison failed to qualify for the NCAA tournament, but were invited to the 2011 College Basketball Invitational. The Dukes were eliminated in the first round of the CBI in a loss to Davidson, 85–65.

Roster 

Source

Schedule and results

|-
!colspan=9 style=|Exhibition

|-
!colspan=9 style=|Regular season

|-
!colspan=9 style=| CAA tournament

|-
!colspan=9 style=| CBI

Source

References

James Madison Dukes men's basketball seasons
James Madison
James Madison
James Madison men's basketball
James Madison men's basketball